
"(Do the) Mashed Potatoes" is a rhythm and blues instrumental. It was recorded by James Brown with his band in 1959 and released as a two-part single in 1960. For contractual reasons the recording was credited to "Nat Kendrick and the Swans".

Circumstances of the recording
The recording of "(Do the) Mashed Potatoes" arose out of James Brown's success in using the Mashed Potato dance as part of his stage show. Brown wanted to record a Mashed Potatoes-themed instrumental with his band in order to capitalize on the dance's popularity. However, King Records head Syd Nathan, a frequent critic of Brown's proposals, would not allow it. (The first instrumental recorded by Brown and his band, titled "Doodle Bee" and credited to Brown's tenor saxophonist J.C. Davis, had not sold well when it was released on King's sister label Federal Records.) Brown approached Henry Stone, a friend in the music business who ran the Dade Records label, about recording the piece with him. Stone, although nervous about crossing Nathan (with whom he did business), arranged for Brown to record at his Miami studio.

"(Do The) Mashed Potatoes" was recorded with Brown playing the piano and shouting the song's title. To prevent Brown's voice from being recognized, Stone overdubbed shouted vocals by Carlton "King" Coleman, a local radio DJ, onto the recording, though Brown's voice remains audible in the background. Leadership of the band was officially credited to Nat Kendrick, who was Brown's drummer at the time, while the writing was credited to "Dessie Rozier", a pseudonym for Brown. A simple twelve bar blues tune, "(Do the) Mashed Potatoes" became a Top Ten R&B hit in 1960 and fed what would eventually grow into a national dance craze. The band recorded several more singles under the Nat Kendrick & the Swans name, including "Dish Rag", "Slow Down", and "Wobble Wobble", but none was successful. Eventually made aware of Brown's outside success, Syd Nathan relented and allowed him to release future instrumentals on King, starting with the 1961 single "Hold It" b/w "The Scratch".

James Brown had a second Mashed Potatoes-themed hit with "Mashed Potatoes U.S.A." in 1962.

Personnel
"Nat Kendrick & The Swans":
 Carlton "King" Coleman - lead vocal
 Alfred Corley - alto saxophone
 J.C. Davis - tenor saxophone
 James Brown - piano, vocal yelps
 Bobby Roach - guitar
 Bernard Odum - bass
 Nat Kendrick - drums

Charts

Steve Alaimo version:

Other versions
Steve Alaimo released the song in 1962, also on album Mashed Potatoes.

The British beat group The Undertakers recorded a cover version of "(Do the) Mashed Potatoes" in 1963.

German beat group The Rattles recorded a version for their 1963 debut single A-side.

The Kingsmen covered the song on their 1964 album The Kingsmen In Person.

James Brown recorded a remake of "(Do the) Mashed Potatoes" for his 1980 album Soul Syndrome.

Surf rock group Man or Astroman released a cover of the song called "Space Potatoes" on their 1993 EP Captain Holojoy's Space Diner, with modified lyrics.

References
 Guralnick, P. (1986). Sweet Soul Music: Rhythm and Blues and the Southern Dream of Freedom. New York: Back Bay Books. .
 Leeds, Alan M., and Harry Weinger (1991). Star Time: Song by Song. In Star Time (pp. 46–53) [CD liner notes]. London: Polydor Records.
 Nat Kendrick & The Swans. Henry Stone Music, Inc.
 White, Cliff, and Harry Weinger (1991). Are You Ready for Star Time? In Star Time (pp. 14–44) [CD liner notes]. London: Polydor Records.
 Wolk, Douglas. (2004). Live at the Apollo. New York: Continuum Books.

James Brown songs
Songs written by James Brown
1960 debut singles
1960s instrumentals
1959 songs
Songs about dancing
Novelty and fad dances
Checker Records singles
Hep Stars songs